Sigyn Glacier is a broad glacier flowing north between the Drygalski Mountains and the Kurze Mountains in Queen Maud Land. It was mapped and named from surveys and air photos by Norwegian Antarctic Expedition (1956–60) after Sigyn in Norse mythology.

See also
 List of glaciers in the Antarctic
 Glaciology

References
 

Glaciers of Queen Maud Land
Orvin Mountains